Eriogonum alatum, with the common names winged buckwheat and winged eriogonum, is a species of buckwheat.

The plant is native to the western Great Plains, the Southwestern United States, and Chihuahua state in México.

Varieties
Varieties include:
Eriogonum alatum var. alatum
Eriogonum alatum var. glabriusculum

Uses
Among the Zuni people, the root is eaten as an emetic for stomachaches. An infusion of the powdered root is taken after a fall and to relieve general misery.

References

External links
  USDA Plants Profile for Eriogonum alatum (winged buckwheat)
 BRIT.org: Native American Ethnobotany Database on Eriogonum alatum

alatum
Flora of the North-Central United States
Flora of the United States
Flora of the Great Plains (North America)
Flora of the South-Central United States
Flora of Arizona
Flora of Chihuahua (state)
Flora of New Mexico
Flora of Utah
Flora of Wyoming
Plants used in traditional Native American medicine
Plants described in 1853
Taxa named by John Torrey
Flora without expected TNC conservation status